The Rock & Roll Story, is an album by Conway Twitty, released in 1960. It contains covers of major rock and roll hits from the late 1950s.

Track listing
Reelin' and a Rockin' (Chuck Berry)
Handy Man (JimmyJones, Otis Blackwell)
Whole Lotta Shakin' Goin On (Dave Williams, Sunny David)
Splish Splash (Bobby Darin, Jean Murray)
Blue Suede Shoes (Carl Perkins)
It's Only Make Believe (Conway Twitty, Jack Nance)
Shake, Rattle and Roll (Charles Calhoun)
Diana (Paul Anka)
Jailhouse Rock (Jerry Leiber, Mike Stoller)
Treat Me Nice (Jerry Leiber, Mike Stoller)
Great Balls of Fire (Jack Hammer, Otis Blackwell)
The Girl Can't Help It (Bobby Troup)
 

1960 albums
Conway Twitty albums